Michel Bensch (23 January 1925 – 24 February 2014) was a Belgian footballer. He played in three matches for the Belgium national football team in 1952.

References

External links
 

1925 births
2014 deaths
Belgian footballers
Belgium international footballers
People from Beringen, Belgium
Association football midfielders
K. Beringen F.C. players